Jessica Gaspar (born December 7, 1976) is an American former professional basketball player. After graduating from University of North Carolina in 1999, she went overseas and played professional basketball in Iceland.

Early life
Gasper attended Dartmouth High School where she played basketball and was a four-time Eastern Athletic League All-Star. She averaged 26.4 points during her senior season. During the post-season, she averaged 31.2 points per game.

College career
Gaspar played with the North Carolina Tar Heels from 1995–1999, winning the ACC twice and advancing to the NCAA tournament three times (1997–1999). During the second round of the 1997 NCAA tournament, as the Tar Heels where eliminating Michigan State, Gaspar tore her ACL in her left knee while driving to the basket.

Iceland 
Gaspar joined KFÍ in the Icelandic Úrvalsdeild kvenna for the 2000–01 season. She broke the Úrvalsdeild single game assist record on November 24, 2000, when she had 17 assists against Grindavík and led the team to a 10-6 record, good for third place, and first ever playoff appearance. Despite averaging 19.5 points and 13.5 rebounds, KFÍ got swept by Keflavík in the semi-finals. Gaspar led the league in scoring (24.1 ppg), assists (5.3 apg) and steals (5.1 spg) while coming second in rebounds (10,0). For her efforts she was voted the Foreign player of the year.

Gaspar joined UMFG for the 2001–02 season and won the Icelandic Cup with them after defeating Keflavík in the finals, 82-58. After averaging 21.5 points in the first 11 league games, she sustained a partial tear in the anterior cruciate ligament in her left knee in January, the same ACL she had surgically repaired at the end of her sophomore season at UNC in 1997, and missed the rest of the season. Despite the injury, she led the league in rebounds (13.7), set a league record for steals per game (7.2) and was once again voted the Foreign player of the year.

Titles, awards and achievements

Titles
ACC champion: 1997, 1998
Icelandic Basketball Cup: 2002

Awards
Úrvalsdeild Foreign Player of the Year: 2001, 2002

Achievements
Úrvalsdeild scoring champion: 2001
Úrvalsdeild assists leader: 2001
Úrvalsdeild rebounding leader: 2002
Úrvalsdeild steals leader: 2001, 2002

External links
 Tar Heels player profile

References

1976 births
Living people
American expatriate basketball people in Iceland
Basketball players from Massachusetts
North Carolina Tar Heels women's basketball players
Point guards
People from Dartmouth, Massachusetts
Úrvalsdeild kvenna basketball players
Grindavík women's basketball players
Vestri women's basketball players